Bellburn is an unincorporated community and coal town in Greenbrier County, West Virginia, United States.

References

Unincorporated communities in Greenbrier County, West Virginia
Unincorporated communities in West Virginia
Coal towns in West Virginia